Slonim is a city in Grodno Region, Belarus, and the administrative center of Slonim District. The population in 2015 was 49,739.

Etymology and historical names
Slonim has been known by several versions of its name: Сло́нім (Belarusian), Słonim (Polish), Сло́ним (Russian). Slonim was first mentioned in chronicles in 1252 as Uslonim and in 1255 as Vslonim. According to one version (which is also considered to be an official one), the name of the city originates from the Slavic word 'zaslona' (a screen), meaning that the city used to be an outpost at the southern border of Grand Duchy of Lithuania. Another version, proposed by Jazep Stabroŭski, states that Slonim is a derivative from 'Užslenimas' in the Lithuanian language simply means 'beyond the valley'.

History

Middle Ages
The earliest record is of a wooden fort on the left bank of the Shchara river in the 11th century, although there may have been earlier settlement.

The area was disputed between the Grand Duchy of Lithuania and Kievan Rus' in early history and it changed hands several times. In 1040, the Kievans won control of the area after a battle but lost Slonim to the Lithuanians in 1103. The Ruthenians retook the area early in the 13th century but were expelled by a Tatar invasion in 1241 and the town was pillaged. When, later in the year, the Tatars withdrew, Slonim became part of the Grand Duchy of Lithuania once again, in personal union with the Kingdom of Poland after the Union of Krewo of 1385.

Early modern period
In 1532 King Sigismund I of Poland granted Slonim town rights. In 1558, King Sigismund II Augustus, in a privilege issued in Wilno, established two two-week fairs.

In 1569, the Polish–Lithuanian union was transformed into a single state and Słonim became an important regional centre within the newly established Polish–Lithuanian Commonwealth. Administratively it was part of the Nowogródek Voivodeship. Thanks to the efforts of nobleman, statesman and Słonim starost Lew Sapieha, King Sigismund III Vasa renewed the town rights of Słonim and granted the city coat of arms, which included the Lis coat of arms of Sapieha. Also thanks to Lew Sapieha, from 1631 to 1685 the city flourished as the seat of the Lithuanian diet.

The wars had damaged Slonim, but in the 18th century, a local Polish landowner, count Ogiński, encouraged the recovery of the area; a canal was dug to connect the Shchara with the Dnieper river, now known as the Oginski Canal. Ogiński also built a greater complex, combining an opera theater, a school of music and a school of ballet, and a printing house.

Late modern period

The Polish–Lithuanian Commonwealth was dismantled in a series of three "partitions" in the second half of the 18th century and divided among its neighbours, Prussia, Habsburg Austria and Russian Empire which took the largest portion of the territory. Slonim was in the area annexed by Russia in 1795. Administratively it was part of the Slonim Governorate until 1797, Vilna Governorate until 1801 and Grodno Governorate until World War I. In 1897 it was the fourth largest city of the governorate after the leading cities of Białystok, Grodno and Brześć.

Russian control lasted until 1915, when the German army captured the town. After the First World War, the Slonim area was disputed between the Soviet Union and the newly recreated state of Poland. The town suffered badly in the Polish-Soviet war of 1920. It was ceded by the Bolsheviks to Poland in the 1921 Peace of Riga and became a part of Nowogródek Voivodeship of the Second Polish Republic.

Slonim was one of the many towns in Poland that had a significant Jewish population. The imposing Great Synagogue, built in 1642, survived the destruction and brutal Nazi liquidation of the Słonim Ghetto with 10,000 Jews massacred in 1942 alone. The 10 small synagogues around the Great Synagogue called Stiblach did not survive.

World War II and the post-war period

In 1939, the Molotov–Ribbentrop Pact between Nazi Germany and the Soviet Union resulted in the invasion of Poland by the two powers and its division between them. Slonim was in the area designated by the Pact to fall within the Soviet sphere of influence. The Soviets placed that area within the Byelorussian SSR. Two years later, Germany invaded the Soviets (Operation Barbarossa) and Slonim was captured. The Słonim Jews were herded into the Słonim Ghetto set up at the Na Wyspie neighbourhood across the bridge on the Szczara River. Soon thereafter, 70% of Slonim's Jews had been killed by the Einsatzgruppen, including 9,000 on 14 November 1941. The second mass murder of 8,000 Jews took place in 1942. In 1944, on the insistence of Joseph Stalin in Yalta the Soviet Union retained possession of the eastern parts of pre-war Poland including Słonim, as agreed between the Allies. The Polish population was forcibly resettled to new post-war Polish boundaries before the end of 1946.

After the dissolution of the Soviet Union, Slonim became part of an independent state of Belarus.

In 2019 a Soviet-era statue of Vladimir Lenin in the city center was replaced with a new monument of Lew Sapieha.

Historic population
The population of Slonim fluctuated, influenced by local prosperity and wars {1883, 21,110; 1897 15,893}. Jewish settlement in Slonim appears to have started in 1388, following encouragement from the Lithuanian authorities. They were credited with the development of local commerce in the 15th century, nonetheless, they were temporarily expelled by the Duchy in 1503. In the late 19th century, Slonim's Jewish population had risen to more than 10,000. The Slonimer Hasidic dynasty came from there. Michael and Ephraim Marks (of Marks & Spencer) were born in Slonim.

The wealthiest family in Slonim before World War II were the Rabinowicz brothers, Vigdor and Yossel. Their parents were Dov-Ber and Rivka Rochel (née Kancepolski). After World War I, they entered the forestry business together with Yaakov Milikowski, and were known as the Rabmils.  They escaped the Nazi atrocities by flying to Mandatory Palestine.

Economy

Slonim's importance derives from the river, which is navigable and joins the Oginski canal, connecting the Niemen with the Dnieper.

Slonim has varied food, consumer, and engineering industries. Corn, tar, and especially timber are exported. There is the Slonim artistic goods factory, a worsted factory and “Textilschik”, a paperboard factory, motor- and car-repair plants, a dry non-fat milk factory and meat processing plant. There are also flax preprocessing, feed mill and woodworking enterprises in the town.

The 11th Guards Mechanized Brigade, withdrawn from Germany in 1992, is stationed in the town.

Media
Slonim's biggest newspaper is the independent Gazeta Slonimskaya (Газета Слонімская). Founded in 1997, it is a weekly newspaper with a circulation over 5,000 copies. It is published every Wednesday, and contains local and regional news, sections on sport, culture and lifestyle, and local advertising. It is currently 40 pages, plus an additional weekly 8-page supplement called Otdushina (Отдушина), focusing on youth, culture and religious affairs. The newspaper is written in both Russian and Belarusian.

An earlier Gazeta Slonimskaya was originally published in 1938 and 1939, at that time in Polish.

Another local newspaper is Slonimski Vesnik. Being a state owned newspaper, it is run and censored by local authorities. Slonimski Vesnik is published three times a week and has a circulation of around 3,000 copies.

Transport and infrastructure
Slonim has road-links with Baranovichi, Ivatsevichi, Ruzhany, Volkovysk, and Lida. There are around a dozen bus routes in Slonim and half a dozen of mini-bus routes. Taxi services are widely available. Slonim is on the railway line between Baranavichy and Vaukavysk.

Notable buildings

 Orthodox church of the Holy Trinity (former Catholic church of the Holy Trinity, Baroque)
 Convent of the Benedictines
 Chapel of St. Dominick
 St Andrew's Church (Baroque)
 Catholic church of the Immaculate Conception of Blessed Virgin Mary and the convent of Bernardine
 Orthodox church of Transfiguration (former Catholic church), Baroque, dating back to the 17th century
 The Great Synagogue of Slonim, building of a former major synagogue of a large Jewish community that used to live in Slonim before the Second World War. The building is in a dilapidated condition. It is listed by the private World Monuments Fund as their top priority site of Jewish interest in Eastern Europe that requires restoration. The building was left untouched by the German Luftwaffe during World War II, but it has subsequently deteriorated and is now in urgent need of protection and restoration.  British TV personality Natasha Kaplinsky was the subject of one of a series of BBC television programmes, Who Do You Think You Are?. Kaplinsky visited the synagogue, it having been the place of worship of her great-grandparents. Her cousin sang a lament in Hebrew in the synagogue.

Slonim has also a theatre and a museum of regional studies, as well as a medical school. There is a new recreation area development in north-east Slonim called Enka. The main sports are: running, gymnastics, football and ice hockey.
Northeast of Slonim, there is a CHAYKA-transmitter.

Notable residents 

 Samuel Hirszhorn (1876–1942), Polish-Jewish writer, journalist, and politician, born in Slonim
 Michael Marks (June 1859, Slonim  – 31 December 1907, Salford), Jewish businessman and entrepreneur, and co-founder of the British retail chain Marks & Spencer.

See also
Anshe Slonim Synagogue in the Lower East Side of Manhattan, New York

Notes

References
 Cholawski, Shalom. Slonim in Encyclopaedia of the Holocaust vol. 4, pp. 1363–1364. Map.

External links

 Gazeta Slonimskaya on the web
 Photos on Radzima.org
 
 

 
Cities in Belarus
Populated places in Grodno Region
Slonim District
Nowogródek Voivodeship (1507–1795)
Slonimsky Uyezd
Nowogródek Voivodeship (1919–1939)
Holocaust locations in Belarus
Jewish communities destroyed in the Holocaust